In enzymology, a thymidylate synthase (FAD) is an enzyme that catalyzes the chemical reaction

5,10-methylenetetrahydrofolate + dUMP + FADH2  dTMP + tetrahydrofolate + FAD

The 3 substrates of this enzyme are 5,10-methylenetetrahydrofolate, dUMP, and FADH2, whereas its 3 products are dTMP, tetrahydrofolate, and FAD.

This enzyme belongs to the family of transferases, to be specific those transferring one-carbon group methyltransferases.  The systematic name of this enzyme class is 5,10-methylenetetrahydrofolate,FADH2:dUMP C-methyltransferase. Other names in common use include Thy1, and ThyX.  This enzyme participates in pyrimidine metabolism and one carbon pool by folate.

Most organisms, including humans, use the thyA- or TYMS-encoded classic thymidylate synthase whereas some bacteria use the similar flavin-dependent thymidylate synthase (FDTS) instead.

Structural studies

See also
Thymidylate synthetase

References

 

EC 2.1.1
Enzymes of known structure